Goat head may refer to:

 Goat's head, a common name for several plants
 Sigil of Baphomet, the official symbol of LaVeyan Satanism and the Church of Satan
 "Goat Head", a song by Brittany Howard from the album Jaime
 Official black and red logo on the jerseys worn by the Buffalo Sabres from 1996-2006

See also
 Goats Head Soup, a 1973 album by The Rolling Stones